Narathiwat is a town (thesaban mueang) in southern Thailand and capital of Narathiwat Province. The town is in the Mueang Narathiwat District and was established in 1936. As of 2008, the population was 40,521. It lies 1,141 km south of Bangkok.

Geography
Narathiwat is on the east coast of the Malay Peninsula, by the Gulf of Thailand. The Bang Nara River flows through the town. The immediate vicinity of the town is flat or gently rolling, but there are hills both to the west and south.

Climate
Narathiwat has a tropical monsoon climate (Köppen climate classification Am). Since Narathiwat is very close to the equator, there is little change in temperature during the year. Rainfall is abundant throughout the year, but there is a drier season from February to April, and rainfall is particularly heavy in November and December.

Transportation
Route 42, to the north, connects the town to Pattani and then to the Phet Kasem Road (Route 4), which connects to Bangkok. Routes 4055 and 4056 lead south-west, in succession, to the Malaysia–Thailand border at Su-ngai Kolok, while Route 4084 leads south to Tak Bai and then east via Route 4057 to Su-ngai Kolok.

The town is served by Narathiwat Airport,  to the north.

See also
Chat Warin Waterfall

References

External links

http://www.naracity.go.th Town website

1936 establishments in Siam
Cities and towns in Thailand
Gulf of Thailand
Populated places established in 1936
Populated places in Narathiwat province